Deng Deng Akon is a South Sudanese politician. He is a member of the Sudan People's Liberation Movement-in-Opposition, and has been speaker of the Council of States since 2021.

In 2020, he was a member of the Cabinet of South Sudan.

References 

Living people
Year of birth missing (living people)
Legislative speakers
Sudan People's Liberation Movement politicians
Government ministers of South Sudan